Debbie Patton is an American bodybuilder who competed at the World Amateur Bodybuilding Championships in 2003–2004. She won the NPC Team Universe competition in 2003–2005, and turned professional in 2005.

Contest history 
2002	Illinois State Champion
2002	Jr. Nationals – 6th 
2003	Indiana State Champion
2003	Jr. Nationals – 12th 
2003	Master Nationals – 3rd 
2003	Team Universe – 1st middleweight
2003	IFBB World Championships – 12th 
2004	Master Nationals – 1st 
2004	Team Universe – 1st middleweight
2004	North American Championships – 3rd middleweight
2004 	World Championships – 11th middleweight
2005 	Master's Nationals – 3rd
2005 	Team Universe – 1st heavyweight and overall, Pro card
2006 IFBB Atlantic City Pro – 26th
2010 IFBB Phoenix Pro – 21st

References

External links 

Personal blog

American female bodybuilders
Living people
Professional bodybuilders
Year of birth missing (living people)
21st-century American women